Daniel Linville is an American politician and business owner, currently serving as a Republican Assistant Majority Whip in the West Virginia House of Delegates, representing the 16th district.

Early life 
Linville was born and raised in Milton, West Virginia to parents Carla and Steve Linville and graduated from Marshall University.

Career

Political career 
Linville was appointed to the West Virginia House of Delegates as a member from the 16th district in August 2018 after C.E. Romine resigned for health and personal reasons. He successfully sought reelection in the 2020 general election.

In addition to his party leadership position in the House, Linville serves as the chair of the Technology & Infrastructure Committee. He additionally serves on the Finance Committee; Committee on Senior, Children and Family Issues; and the Small Business Entrepreneurship and Economic Development Committee. Linville is also a member of several interim committees, including the Employee Suggestion Award Board, of which he serves as chair; the Select Committee on Infrastructure, of which he serves as vice chair; the Joint Standing Committee on Finance; the Legislative Oversight Committee on Regional Jail and Correctional Facility Authority; and the Joint Committee on Technology.

Community involvement 
Linville is involved with several civic organizations, including the Rotary Club; Cabell County Farm Bureau; and on the Cabell-Wayne Beekeeper's Association. He is also a member of the Board of Directors of the Keith Albee Performing Arts Theater.

References 

Living people
Republican Party members of the West Virginia House of Delegates
21st-century American politicians
Marshall University alumni
People from Milton, West Virginia
Year of birth missing (living people)